Michael Bradley (died 23 November 1923) was an Irish Labour Party politician. He was elected to Dáil Éireann at the 1922 general election, representing the Cork Mid, North, South, South East and West constituency. He did not seek re-election at the 1923 general election.

References

Year of birth missing
1923 deaths
Labour Party (Ireland) TDs
Members of the 3rd Dáil
People of the Irish Civil War (Pro-Treaty side)